Vicente Belen Amante, commonly known as Vic Amante, is a Filipino politician who serve as the mayor of City of San Pablo in the Philippines since 2022. He previously served from 1992 to 2001 and again from 2004 to 2013.  He is the chairman of the board of trustees of the Pamantasan ng Lungsod ng San Pablo (PLSP).

References

Living people
Lakas–CMD politicians
People from San Pablo, Laguna
Nacionalista Party politicians
Mayors of places in Laguna (province)
Year of birth missing (living people)